Tomoki is a masculine Japanese given name.

Possible writings
Tomoki can be written using many different combinations of kanji characters. Some examples:

友紀, "friend, chronicle"
友規, "friend, to scheme"
友喜, "friend, rejoice"
友貴, "friend, precious"
友機, "friend, opportunity/machine"
友基, "friend, foundation"
友輝, "friend, sparkle"
友起, "friend, rise/wake up"
友希, "friend, hope"
友毅, "friend, firm"
知紀, "know, chronicle"
知規, "know, to scheme"
知喜, "know, rejoice"
知貴, "know, precious"
知機, "know, opportunity/machine"
知樹, "know, tree"
智紀, "intellect, chronicle"
智規, "intellect, to scheme"
智喜, "intellect, rejoice"
智貴, "intellect, precious"
共紀, "together, chronicle"
共貴, "together, precious"
朋喜, "companion, rejoice"
朋毅, "companion, firm"
朝紀, "morning/dynasty, chronicle"
朝機, "morning/dynasty, opportunity/machine"
朝樹, "morning/dynasty, tree"
朝毅, "morning/dynasty, firm"

The name can also be written in hiragana ともき or katakana トモキ.

Notable people with the name
, Japanese composer and arranger
, Japanese footballer
, Japanese baseball player
, Japanese footballer
, Japanese footballer
, Japanese Mexican boxer
, Japanese composer and arranger
, Japanese anime director
, Japanese anime director
, Japanese footballer
, Japanese baseball player
, Japanese rugby union player
, Japanese futsal player

Fictional characters
, protagonist of the manga series Sora no Otoshimono
, Tommy Himi in English dub, a character from Digimon Frontier
, a character in Watamote

See also
6101 Tomoki, a main-belt minor planet

Japanese masculine given names